The Mitsubishi Ha-43, known as the Ha-211 by the Imperial Japanese Army Air Force (IJAAF) and MK9 by the Imperial Japanese Navy Air Service (IJNAS)),  was a Japanese 18-cylinder, twin-row air-cooled radial engine developed during World War II.  It was a more powerful derivative of Mitsubishi's 14-cylinder Kinsei.  While planned for use in several promising aircraft, only prototypes were made and the engine never saw combat.

Design and development
The Ha-43 was Mitsubishi's answer to Nakajima's Ha-45.  The engine was planned to produce  while retaining high reliability and a superior power-to-weight ratio compared to contemporary engines in its class.  The frontal area per hp. was also intended to be the smallest in the world.  However, such ambitious targets necessitated extraordinary efforts and ingenuity at the same time.

At the time, Mitsubishi was working to promote a different engine, the Ha-42 (an 18-cylinder derivative of the Kasei), development of which was prioritized above the Ha-43's, delaying its completion.  Consequently, the Ha-45 entered service first, albeit plagued with reliability issues, which would also trouble the Ha-43.  Numerous promising aircraft, such as the Kyushu J7W interceptor and Mitsubishi's own A7M Reppu fighter, were planned to use the Ha-43, but in the end, such aircraft did not see service before Japan's surrender, nor did the engine itself.

Variants and designations
Data from: Japanese Aero-Engines 1910-1945
A20 Company designation
Ha-211 IJAAF designation
MK9 IJNAS designation
Ha-43 Unified (IJAAF and IJNAS) designation system

Applications
Kawanishi N1K5-J (project; not built)
Kyushu J7W1
Mansyū Ki-98
Mitsubishi A7M2/A7M3
Mitsubishi J4M
Mitsubishi Ki-83

Specifications (Ha-43/Ha-211/MK9)

See also

References

Ha43
Aircraft air-cooled radial piston engines
1940s aircraft piston engines